Manuel Canabal Fiestras (born 10 November 1974 in Forcarei, Province of Pontevedra) is a Spanish retired professional footballer who played as a centre-forward.

Honours
Mérida
Segunda División: 1996–97

Málaga
UEFA Intertoto Cup: 2002

References

External links

1974 births
Living people
Sportspeople from the Province of Pontevedra
Spanish footballers
Footballers from Galicia (Spain)
Association football forwards
La Liga players
Segunda División players
Segunda División B players
Pontevedra CF footballers
CD Leganés players
CP Mérida footballers
Real Madrid CF players
Real Valladolid players
Deportivo Alavés players
Rayo Vallecano players
Málaga CF players